Jean Desanlis (5 September 1925 – 5 February 2023) was a French veterinarian and politician.

Biography
Born in Montloué on 5 September 1925, Desanlis attended the École nationale vétérinaire d'Alfort until 1950. He then began a veterinary practice in Montoire before moving to Vendôme in June 1951.

Desanlis was first elected to the municipal council of Vendôme in 1959. He was re-elected in 1982, having become vice-president of the General Council in 1976. In 1973 French legislative election, he was elected as a deputy of the National Assembly for Loir-et-Cher's 3rd constituency, a position he served until 1997.

Jean Desanlis died in Brittany on 5 February 2023, at the age of 97.

References

1925 births
2023 deaths
French veterinarians
Deputies of the 5th National Assembly of the French Fifth Republic
Deputies of the 6th National Assembly of the French Fifth Republic
Deputies of the 7th National Assembly of the French Fifth Republic
Deputies of the 8th National Assembly of the French Fifth Republic
Deputies of the 9th National Assembly of the French Fifth Republic
Deputies of the 10th National Assembly of the French Fifth Republic
Union for French Democracy politicians
People from Aisne